Kırcalar can refer to the following villages in Turkey:

 Kırcalar, Azdavay
 Kırcalar, Kastamonu
 Kırcalar, Lapseki